Grace Campbell may refer to:
 Grace Campbell (1883–1943), American politician
 Grace Campbell (author) (1895–1963), Canadian writer
 Grace Campbell Stewart  (died 1863), British miniature painter
 Grace Campbell (footballer) (born 1995), Australian rules footballer